These are all the awards and nominations received by Thalía in all her solo career, both as singer as actress.

Furthermore, she has a Guinness Record because she has been the most awarded person in a day.

She received one star in the famous Hollywood Walk Of Fame, on December 5, 2013.

In total, Thalía has received 7 Latin Grammy nominations and has won an accolade called Premio de La Presidencia at 2019 Latin Grammy Awards. Thalía has 5 Billboard Latin Music Awards, 8 Premios Lo Nuestro and others.

She was inducted into the Plaza de las Estrellas in Mexico City.

Latin Grammy Awards

|-
| align="center"| 2019
| align="center"| Herself
| align="center"| President's Merit Award
|
|-
| align="center"| 2014
| align="center"| Viva Kids Vol. 1
| align="center"| Best Latin Children's Album
|
|-
| align="center"| 2010
| align="center"| Primera fila
| align="center"| Best Long Form Music Video
|
|-
| align="center"| 2006
| align="center"| El Sexto Sentido: Re+Loaded
| align="center"| Best Female Pop Vocal Album
|
|-
| align="center"| 2003
| align="center"| Thalía
| align="center"| Best Female Pop Vocal Album
|
|-
| align="center"| 2002
| align="center"| Con Banda Grandes Exitos
| align="center"| Best Banda Album
|
|-
| rowspan= "1" align="center"| 2001
| rowspan= "1" align="center"| Arrasando
| align="center"| Best Female Pop Vocal Album
|
|-

Billboard Music Video Awards

Premios Oye!

Premio Orgullosamente Latino

Premio Juventud

Ritmo Latino Awards

Quiero Awards 
The Quiero Awards are awarded by Argentine TV channel "Quiero TV" to prize music artists. Thalía has been nominated seven times.

Vevo Certified Awards 
The Vevo Certified Awards are given to an artists after a video reaches 100 million views on Vevo. Thalía has received the award with eleven of her videos.

World Music Awards

Latin Music Fan Award

Premio Paoli

Premio Eres

Premio Gente

Premio A.T.R.

 Premio A.C.E. (Asociación de Cronistas del Espectáculo de Nueva York)

Premio Furia Musical

Premio Tú música

Premios Telehit

Premio Heraldo

Premios TVyNovelas

Premios TVyNovelas

Premio Amigo

Premio Latin America

Premio Laurel de Oro

Otros premios

Premio A.C.E. (Asociación de Cronistas del Espectáculo de Nueva York)

Premio Eres

Premio Heraldo

Premio Bravo

Premio Las Palmas de Oro

Premio Calendario Azteca

Otros premios

References



Awards
Thalia